Rob Forbes is an American designer and entrepreneur.  He is the founder of the furniture company Design Within Reach, and of the bicycle retailer PUBLIC Bikes.

Early life and education 

Forbes grew up in Pasadena and Laguna Beach, California. He studied aesthetics at UC Santa Cruz and received an Masters of Fine Arts in ceramics from New York State College of Ceramics at Alfred University.

Career

Forbes received a National Endowment for the Arts grant, and spent his early career as a potter and exhibiting artist; he also taught at Philadelphia College of Art. After earning his MBA at Stanford University, Forbes worked as a marketer at Williams Sonoma, Smith & Hawken, and the Nature Company.

Design Within Reach 

In 1999 Forbes founded the company Design Within Reach, which marketed European modern furnishings  to American buyers.  Products were shipped directly to the buyer through catalogue and online ordering.  After rapid initial growth, Design Within Reach became a public company in 2004. Shortly thereafter Forbes left the company; by 2009 it was in financial difficulty, delisted from the stock exchange and was sold to hedge fund Glenhill Capital Management.

PUBLIC Bikes 

In 2010 he founded PUBLIC Bikes, an online bike retailer.  The company designs and sells European-style bicycles aimed at urban cyclists.

Other art and design work
Forbes opened an art studio in San Francisco. In 2011, he curated an exhibit of pottery and ceramics at Frakn Lloyd Gallery in Santa Monica.

Forbes writes and lectures on visual thinking and modern design. He presented a TED Talk, "Ways of Seeing" in 2006, and has also spoken at AGFA SF. Forbes has written a book called See For Yourself, released in May 2015. He created and contributes to DWR Design Notes, a monthly newsletter on modernism and design.

Publications 
See For Yourself by Rob Forbes. 
Design Research: The Store That Brought Modern Living to American Homes, 2010 by Jane Thompson and Alexandra Lange, foreword by Rob Forbes. 
How to See, 2nd edition by George Nelson, foreword by Rob Forbes. 
Bent Ply by Dung Ngo, Eric Pfeiffer, a book about the story of plywood in Modernist furniture design, foreword by Rob Forbes. 
Heath Ceramics, a book about the history of the ceramics company by Amos Klausner, contributor Rob Forbes.

References

External links 
Studio Forbes
PUBLIC Bikes
Design Within Reach
DWR Design Notes

Year of birth missing (living people)
Living people
American designers
University of California, Santa Cruz alumni
New York State College of Ceramics alumni